Lahore to Longsight is the debut album of British musician Aziz Ibrahim. Ibrahim describes it as being 'Asian Blues', the album title describes his family's journey from Lahore to Longsight, Lahore being the second largest city of Pakistan and Longsight Aziz's birthplace in inner city Manchester, where he still lives.

Description
The Album was recorded over at various studios around the country, and is graced with guest appearances from Paul Weller, Steve White, Andy Rourke, Mike Joyce, Talvin Singh, Gary Mounfield (Mani), Alan Wren (Reni) and Inder Goldfinger. All tracks were produced by Aziz Ibrahim and barring a couple, were written, and arranged by Aziz Ibrahim. The two co-writes on the album are titled "Korma Coma" and 'Mummys' Boy'. The former written with his live band, Andy Rourke and Mike Joyce, the latter Inspired by Reni.

Track list

 Morassi
 Living a Lie
 Mummy's Boy
 Feeling Better
 Forget Yourself
 She Dances With Angels
 The Other Side
 A Face to Die For
 Middle Road
 Stone Haven
 Korma Coma
 Lahore to Longsight
 It's a Pressure to Know You

Reviews
 HYPERLINK "http://www.billboard.com" www.billboard.com

by Aaron Warshaw

Aziz Ibrahim might forever be known as the man who took what Noel Gallagher called "the hardest job in the world": replacing John Squire in The Stone Roses. Ibrahim was raised by Pakistani immigrants in Manchester, England, and showed a natural musical ability at an early age. His first professional experience was touring with Simply Red in the late '80s, and he went on to play with the aging prog rock act Asia in the mid-'90s. In 1996, Ibrahim was announced as Squire's replacement on guitar, who had just left The Stone Roses after a messy split. Ibrahim's first appearance in the Roses came at the 1996 Benicassim Festival (Spain) and then the Reading Festival (U.K.), generally regarded as the final nail in the coffin for a band, which by then had suffered half a decade of quiet and not-so-quiet implosion. Despite this, Ibrahim's playing faithfully and capably replicated Squire's parts; huge shoes to fill, those of someone considered to be among the pantheon of British guitar gods. Indeed, Ibrahim is quite a virtuosic musician, playing naturally in a style that reflects his Eastern heritage and is situated somewhere between raga and hard rock. Despite the demise of the Roses, Ibrahim continued to work with the band's singer, Ian Brown, who had perhaps a surprising career resurrection as a solo artist beginning with 1998's Unfinished Monkey Business. He went on to contribute to several tracks on Brown's follow-up, Golden Greats, and become a semi-permanent member of Brown's touring band. Also during the late '90s, Ibrahim began his own solo career; debuting with the standout track 'Morassi' which featured contributions from Eastern electronic guru Talvin Singh and ex-Roses bassist Mani. Taking time off from work with Brown, Aziz Ibrahim released his own solo album in 2001, titled Lahore to Longsight (Lahore being a city in Pakistan, Longsight being the neighborhood of Manchester where he grew up). The album was released on Ibrahim's own Indus Records, an independent label based in Manchester. The all-star musicians Ibrahim was able to pull in to work on his solo debut—including Paul Weller and his compatriot Steve White, as well as the ex-Smiths rhythm section of Andy Rourke and Mike Joyce—clearly indicated the high esteem Ibrahim's peers hold him in the realm of British rock.

 ~ Aaron Warshaw, All Music Guide

Dean Carlson from Microsoft Music, regarding the albums says that former Stone Roses replacement Aziz Ibrahim is one of those musicians who demands the sort of loyalty known of mutual friends and in-laws, but where the average session grunt can't discern arrogance from reality, Aziz fights for his own strain of luck and skill long enough to pick up the clarity of Arthur Lee and chew on its rind. On the baronial "Living a Lie," he has created something as unique as the Housemartins steeped in political intrigue, with a slightly Eastern arrangement, and in "Mummy's Boy" you get the kind of song the Wonder Stuff would have made if they ever had conviction. But Aziz also seems somewhat unprepared for a full LP, wobbling out after the first act. While Paul Weller; Talvin Singh; ex-Smiths Andy Rourke and Mike Joyce; and ex-Roses Reni and Mani all slot appearances, Aziz is able to build upon the musical themes he sets up with this remarkable pool of talent, but not missing out on the freedom and self-scrutiny that a solo effort like this typically allows. Lahore to Longsight is remarkable for what it is, then, but also for the fact it even exists at all, a debut which accomplishes more than it should while succeeding far more than its gluttonous nexus of musicians implies.

Notes

Songs about Lahore
Aziz Ibrahim albums
2001 debut albums